Sordio is a comune (municipality) in the Province of Lodi in the Italian region Lombardy, located about  southeast of Milan and about  northwest of Lodi.

Sordio borders the following municipalities: Vizzolo Predabissi, Casalmaiocco, Tavazzano con Villavesco and San Zenone al Lambro.

References

Cities and towns in Lombardy